The Poland national under-23 football team or Poland Olympic football team is the national under-23 football team of Poland and is controlled by the Polish Football Association.

Olympic record 
Since 1992, the Olympic team must consist out of under-23 players plus three overage players.

Poland has qualified for only one Olympic competition at 1992, the inaugural edition of the under-23 team, where the team finished second after losing to host Spain in the final. Poland's qualification to Olympics can be decided from the performance of Poland U-21 in the UEFA European Under-21 Championship which served as the qualification stage to the Olympics.

The team has been often coached by the U-21 manager.

Current squad

References

External links
Official website

European Olympic national association football teams
European national under-23 association football teams
Oly
Foot